Powder Horn Mountain (PMH) is a gated residential/resort community in Triplett, Watauga County, North Carolina, located in the Blue Ridge Mountains. The project was founded by developer Bob Horne, and included a golf course, riding stables and trails in nearby Wilkes County, but after undergoing bankruptcy and foreclosure it was divided and sold separately. A group of property owners founded a partnership called the Laurel Creek Group, purchased the homes from foreclosure, and created the Powder Horn Mountain Property Owners Association. The group then deeded the common property to the homeowners association.

The golf course no longer exists, and the land is now owned by many individual owners and is not part of PHM. Leatherwood, a newly formed gated community, is located on the site of the old riding stables. Recent years have seen the community resuming steady but slow growth. The Powder Horn Mountain POA annexed more than  formerly known as "Brightwood IV" into Powder Horn in 2005, an area now known as Powder Horn Estates.   

There is an unrelated Powder Horn Golf Community in Colorado .

See also
Horne's

External links 
Powder Horn Mountain POA website

Gated communities in North Carolina
Buildings and structures in Watauga County, North Carolina